Sian Wyn Lloyd (born 7 August 1968) is a Welsh television news presenter, currently working for BBC News as their Wales correspondent.

Early life
Sian Lloyd was born in Bangor, Gwynedd. Her father's family were from Criccieth, where she spent most summers. Lloyd grew up in Wrexham, and speaks Welsh, English and French. She had a weekend job as a teenager at the National Trust's Erddig Hall. Lloyd gained an LLB in law at   the University of Leicester, before completing her Law Society Finals with Honours at The College of Law Chester.

Career
Lloyd trained as a solicitor with Lovell White Durrant in London and Hong Kong.

Lloyd began her career as a journalist in North Wales as a newsreader for Marcher Coast FM in Colwyn Bay before joining BBC Wales as a reporter 1996, and then having moved to Cardiff went on to present Good Evening Wales for radio, and then BBC Wales Today on television.

Lloyd has taken part in many Welsh language TV programmes on S4C including: cookery challenge Dudley: Pryd o Sêr; comedy chat show Sioe Tudur Owen; magazine programme Heno; and Welsh learners programme Hwb. Lloyd was part of the BBC Wales team of presenters covering the National Eisteddfod of Wales 2011, and has been a judge for the Learner of the Year competition 2012.

Lloyd is currently working for BBC News as their Midlands correspondent. As part of her correspondent role, Lloyd gives regular contributions to BBC's Crimewatch as a reporter. Since the move of various BBC programmes to MediaCityUK in Salford Quays, Manchester in 2012, Lloyd has become a regular relief presenter for BBC Breakfast.

Personal life
Sian lives in Cardiff with her husband and son.

Lloyd supports the Prince's Trust and the Duke of Edinburgh's Award Scheme, and is an ambassador for George Thomas Hospice Care. She has also acted as an ambassador for the Seren Network.

References

External links
 

1968 births
Living people
People from Wrexham County Borough
Welsh-language television presenters
People from Bangor, Gwynedd
Welsh solicitors
Welsh journalists
Welsh women journalists
Welsh television presenters
Welsh women television presenters
BBC Cymru Wales newsreaders and journalists
Alumni of the University of Leicester
20th-century Welsh women
21st-century Welsh women